Alma Jodorowsky (born 26 September 1991) is a French actress, fashion model and singer.

Early life
Jodorowsky is the granddaughter of Alejandro Jodorowsky, movie director and author born to Jewish Ukrainian émigrés in Chile. Her father is actor Brontis Jodorowsky, Alejandro's elder son with Bernadette Landru, her mother is Valérie Crouzet and her uncle is the actor and singer Adán Jodorowsky.

Jodorowsky received her acting training in Parisian theatres and at the Conservatoire du XIVe. In 2011 she attended a three months workshop at the New York Film Academy and in 2013 graduated at the Studio Theatre D'Asnières in France.

Career
Jodorowsky works in television and films, as well as in the fashion industry. She is also the lead vocalist and songwriter of Burning Peacocks, a Paris-based pop band.

Acting
Jodorowsky's first acting job was at age fourteen in a French TV movie called Gaspard le Bandit, set during the Ancien Régime. She made her big-screen debut as Estelle in the French and American movie Eyes Find Eyes, then in the French comedy Sea, No Sex and Sun.

In 2013 Jodorowsky played a supporting role in Abdellatif Kechiche's romantic drama Blue Is the Warmest Colour, winner of the Palme d'Or at the 2013 Cannes Film Festival. She landed the lead role of Evelyn in 2016 British film Kids in Love.

Modelling
Jodorowsky has appeared in fashion magazines such as The Coveteur, Vice, Envy magazine, Marie Claire Italy, and Emirates Woman. In 2011, she was the face of New York's new fashion brand Opening Ceremony, starring in several underwear commercial videos. French magazine Snatch chose her on its cover among the thirteen young promises of 2013.

Jodorowsky was selected by Karl Lagerfeld to feature in his Chanel exhibition The Little Black Jacket, held April 2013 in Dubai. She habitually attends Chanel fashion show during the Paris Fashion Week and her personal style garnered attention from the national and international press.

In June 2013 Jodorowsky starred in luxury parisian jeweler Chaumet's campaign video, "Proud To Be Late", in which she wore the new Class One collection of watches. In 2014, she was made Lancôme's brand ambassador.

Directing
In March 2019 Jodorowsky directed the music video "Saint-Victoire" for the French musician Clara Luciani.

Filmography

References

External links

1991 births
Actresses from Paris
French female models
French film actresses
French television actresses
Living people
21st-century French actresses
French people of Ukrainian-Jewish descent
French people of Chilean descent
French people of Mexican descent